Michael Mayhew may refer to:

 Mike Mayhew (born 1987), rugby union player
 Michael Mayhew (Honorverse), a character in the Honorverse universe

See also